Rhynchophyllis is a genus of moths belonging to the subfamily Tortricinae of the family Tortricidae.

Species
Rhynchophyllis categorica Meyrick, 1932

See also
List of Tortricidae genera

References

External links
Tortricid.net

Sparganothini
Tortricidae genera